Horka Domky is one of the town districts in Třebíč in the Czech Republic. There are apartment blocks here and family houses. The TEDOM company resides here.

External links
 School in Horka Domky

Třebíč quarters